The 2017 FIFA U-17 World Cup was the 17th FIFA U-17 World Cup, a biennial international football tournament contested by men's under-17 national teams. Organised by FIFA, the tournament took place in India between 6 and 28 October 2017, after the country was awarded the hosting rights on 5 December 2013. The tournament marked the first time India have hosted a FIFA tournament and the first Asian country to host U-17 World Cup since United Arab Emirates in 2013. The attendance for this World Cup was a record 1,347,133 surpassing China's record in 1985 with 1,230,976.

The matches were played in six stadiums in six host cities around the country, with the final taking place at the Salt Lake Stadium in Kolkata. Twenty-three teams, besides the host India, managed to qualify for the tournament via participating in their various continental under-17 tournaments. In the first round of the tournament finals, the teams competed in round-robin groups of four for points, where the top two teams in each group along with the top four third placed teams would advance to the next round. These 16 teams will advance to the knockout stage, where three rounds of play decided which teams would participate in the final.

The reigning champions, Nigeria, failed to qualify, becoming the first title holders fail to qualify for the subsequent edition since Switzerland in 2009.

England won the U-17 World Cup for the first time after coming back from a two-goal deficit and beating Spain 5–2 in the final. This made England the second nation, after Brazil in 2003, to win both of FIFA's male age-capped (U-20 and U-17) World Cups in the same calendar year. England has also become the third country, after Brazil and North Korea, to win both U-17 and U-20 World Cup in their respective gender tournaments on the same year, as North Korea had also won both U-17 and U-20 Women's World Cup the previous year. The official match ball used in the tournament was Adidas Krasava.

Host selection
The bids for the 2017 FIFA U-17 World Cup had to be submitted by 15 November 2013. On 28 May 2013 it was announced by FIFA that Azerbaijan, India, Republic of Ireland, and Uzbekistan would bid for the hosting rights.

Finally, on 5 December 2013, FIFA announced that India had won the 2017 FIFA World Cup hosting rights.

Qualified teams
As host, India made their first ever appearance at the FIFA U-17 World Cup and their first appearance in the World Cup at any age level. As well as India, New Caledonia and Niger also made their first appearance in the FIFA U-17 World Cup.

The previous U-17 World Cup title holders, Nigeria, failed to qualify for this edition. In failing to qualify, Nigeria became the first nation since Switzerland in 2009 to fail to qualify for the next edition of the FIFA U-17 World Cup after winning the previous edition.

A total of 24 teams qualified for the final tournament. In addition to India, the other 23 teams qualified from six separate continental competitions. Starting from 2017, the Oceania Football Confederation (OFC) will receive an additional spot (in total two spots), while UEFA will have five instead of six spots.

1.Teams that will make their debut.

Organization

Preparation

The six venues selected for the tournament were given major renovations prior to the FIFA U-17 World Cup. All the stadiums were given new bucket seats, new dressing rooms, new evacuation exits for fans, and new training grounds. Javier Ceppi, the Local Organising Committee director, stated that despite work starting slowly, things eventually became quicker. "It has been a long process in the last two and half years. In India, it takes time to start things but once things start it kind of picks its own pace and in terms of implementation I always say that India is a very good country when it comes to implementation."

Emblem
The official emblem for the tournament was launched on 27 September 2016 at a hotel in Goa during the 2016 AFC U-16 Championship. According to the press release from FIFA the emblem was designed "as a celebration of the country's richness and diversity of cultures, with the main elements of the Indian Ocean, the banyan tree, the kite and the starburst, which is an interpretation of the Ashoka Chakra, an integral part of the national identity."

Tickets

Sales of tickets for the FIFA U-17 World Cup began on 16 May 2017 during a function in New Delhi. Carles Puyol was present during the ticket sales launch as special guest. General ticket sales officially began on 17 May 2017 at 19:11. The time was selected as a tribute to when Mohun Bagan defeated East Yorkshire Regiment in the IFA Shield in 1911, marking the first time an Indian football club defeated a British side in British India. Tickets for the tournament were sold in four phases: Phase one only sold tickets for categories 1 to 3 at each venue with a 60% discount while phase two allowed people to buy tickets for all categories, but only if you are a Visa card holder, at a 50% discount. Phase three allowed anyone to buy tickets with a 25% discount while phase four had tickets at full price. The attendance for matches breached the million mark in the final match of the Round of 16, which made India only the third nation after China and Mexico to register an attendance of over a million for the event. On 28 October 2017, in the 3rd place match-up between Brazil and Mali, India finally beat the existing record of 1,230,976 set in the 1985 FIFA U-16 World Championship edition in China The final attendance figures were 1,347,133.

Mascot 

The mascot is "Kheleo", a Himalayan Clouded Leopard. He wears a jersey with the colours of white, yellow, green and orange. The Minister of Youth Affairs and Sports, Vijay Goel, stated: "Kheleo is young, vibrant, enthustiatic and a perfect representation of our country. He will help us to involve kids in football in a fun way".

Theme Song 
The Theme Song for the 2017 U17 World Cup is called 'Kar Ke Dikhla De Goal' which roughly translates to 'Show that you can score a goal', composed by Pritam and written by Amitabh Bhattacharya features Indian football legend Bhaichung Bhutia along with Kerala Blasters co-owner Sachin Tendulkar and singer Babul Supriyo, who had designed the Mohun Bagan kit half a decade back.

Venues
After being awarded the hosting rights for the FIFA U-17 World Cup, eight locations were shortlisted: Bangalore, Guwahati, Kochi, Kolkata, Margao, Navi Mumbai, New Delhi and Pune. On 29 May 2015, Kochi, Mumbai, Kolkata, and Guwahati were provisionally selected as host locations and was informed two more would be provisionally approved from the list of
Bengaluru, Chennai, Goa, New Delhi and Pune. On 27 October 2016, FIFA officially announced Guwahati, Kochi, Kolkata, Margao, Navi Mumbai and New Delhi as the official host cities for the FIFA U-17 World Cup.

Draw
The draw for the FIFA U-17 World Cup was held on 7 July 2017 at the Hotel Sahara Star in Mumbai, India. The draw was attended by former U-17 World Cup champions Nwankwo Kanu (Nigeria) and former U-20 World Cup champions Esteban Cambiasso (Argentina), as well as India senior international Sunil Chhetri and badminton player P. V. Sindhu.

The 24 teams were drawn into six groups of four teams, with hosts India being allocated to position A1. The rest of the teams were allocated into their respective pots based on a ranking which was built according to past performances during the last five FIFA U-17 World Cups. Importance was given to the most recent U-17 World Cups.

Referees
FIFA's Referees' Committee selected 21 referees, representing all six confederations, to officiate at the U-17 World Cup: Seven from UEFA, four from CONMEBOL, three each from the AFC, CAF, and CONCACAF, and one from the OFC. Interestingly, no referee from host country India were selected to officiate.

Squads

Each team's squad for the FIFA U-17 World Cup consisted of 21 players. Each participating national association had to confirm their final 21-player squad by 21 September 2017. A total of 504 players participated in the tournament. The squads were announced by FIFA on 26 September 2017.

Group stage
The top two teams of each group and the four best third-placed teams advanced to the round of 16.

All times are local, IST (UTC+5:30).

Tiebreakers
The rankings of teams in each group are determined as follows (regulations Article 17.7):

If two or more teams are equal on the basis of the above three criteria, their rankings are determined as follows:

Group A

Group B

Group C

Group D

Group E

Group F

Ranking of third-placed teams
The four best teams among those ranked third are determined as follows (regulations Article 17.7):

Knockout stage
In the knockout stages, if a match is level at the end of normal playing time, the match is determined by a penalty shoot-out (no extra time is played).

In the round of 16, the four third-placed teams were matched with the winners of groups A, B, C, and D. The specific match-ups involving the third-placed teams depend on which four third-placed teams qualified for the round of 16:

Bracket

Round of 16

Quarter-finals

Semi-finals

Third place play-off

Final

Awards
The following awards were given at the conclusion of the tournament. They were all sponsored by Adidas, except for the FIFA Fair Play Award.

Final ranking
As per statistical convention in football, matches decided in extra time are counted as wins and losses, while matches decided by penalty shoot-outs are counted as draws.

Goalscorers
8 goals

 Rhian Brewster

6 goals

 Lassana N'Diaye
 Abel Ruiz

5 goals

 Amine Gouiri
 Jann-Fiete Arp

4 goals

 Keito Nakamura
 Sergio Gómez Martín

3 goals

 Brenner
 Lincoln
 Paulinho
 Juan Peñaloza
 Phil Foden
 Jadon Sancho 
 Eric Ayiah
 Carlos Mejía
 Patrick Palacios
 Allahyar Sayyadmanesh
 Mohammed Dawood Yaseen
 Hadji Dramé
 Djemoussa Traoré
 Josh Sargent
 Timothy Weah

2 goals

 Andrés Gómez
 Morgan Gibbs-White
 Angel Gomes
 Danny Loader
 Alexis Flips
 Wilson Isidor
 Richard Danso
 Ibrahima Soumah
 Fandje Touré
 Younes Delfi
 Saeid Karimi
 Mohammad Sharifi
 Taisei Miyashiro
 Fode Konaté
 Diego Lainez
 Roberto de la Rosa
 Antonio Galeano
 Alan Francisco Rodríguez
 Aníbal Vega
 César Gelabert
 Ferran Torres
 Andrew Carleton

1 goal

 Alan Souza
 Yuri Alberto
 Marcos Antônio
 Wesley
 Weverson
 Déiber Caicedo
 Juan Vidal
 Yecxy Jarquin
 Callum Hudson-Odoi
 Emile Smith Rowe
 Marc Guéhi
 Yacine Adli
 Claudio Gomes
 Maxence Caqueret
 Lenny Pintor
 Noah Awuku
 Yann Aurel Bisseck
 Sahverdi Cetin
 Nicolas Kühn
 John Yeboah
 Ibrahim Sadiq
 Mohammed Kudus
 Emmanuel Toku
 Joshua Canales
 Jeakson Singh Thounaojam
 Mohammad Ghobeishavi
 Vahid Namdari
 Mohammad Sardari
 Taha Shariati
 Ali Kareem
 Takefusa Kubo
 Tochi Suzuki
 Seme Camara
 Salam Giddou
 Cameron Wadenges
 Jekob Jeno
 Max Mata
 Charles Spragg
 Salim Abdourahmane
 Blas Armoa
 Giovanni Bogado
 Fernando David Cardozo
 Leonardo Sánchez Cohener
 Juan Miranda
 Mohamed Moukhliss
 Kerem Atakan Kesgin
 Ahmed Kutucu
 George Acosta
 Ayo Akinola
 Chris Durkin

1 own goal

 Wesley 
 Diego Valencia 
 Bernard Iwa 
 Kiam Wanesse 

2 own goals

 Alexis Duarte 

Source: FIFA

Broadcasting
FIFA released the media licensing rights for the U-17 World Cup on 21 September 2017. In India, the official broadcaster was Sony TEN and Sony ESPN. In the United States, the tournament was broadcast on Fox Sports 2 while the United Kingdom had the tournament broadcast on Eurosport.

Legacy
The 2017 FIFA U-17 World Cup was regarded as a success by the media, FIFA and the tournament organisers. Jaime Yarza, Head of FIFA Tournaments, said, "It's been a fantastic tournament with an overwhelming response of everybody involved. First and foremost, the fans have filled the stadiums in all the matches, showing fair play and respect, cheering on all the teams, and really loving the football they have seen. The figures speak for themselves: more than 1.2 million fans attended games at the stadiums. By the final matchday, we’re probably going to break the [attendance] record of all the other U-17 World Cups and we might even break the record for the U-20 World Cup, which is an amazing achievement. It really shows that India is a footballing nation in every sense. The hard work put in place during so many years has received a great response from everybody. It has been a very proud moment for all of us."

The tournament was the most attended and highest scoring edition of the FIFA U-17 World Cup in history. It was also the highest attended men's age-group World Cup ever, surpassing the attendance record of the FIFA U-20 World Cup. The attendance for this World Cup was a record 1,347,133 surpassing China's 1985 edition where it was 1,230,976, and the 2011 U-20 World Cup in Colombia which was attended by 1,309,929 people.

The 177 goals scored during the tournament made it the highest scoring U-17 World Cup in history, surpassing the previous record of 172 during the 2013 edition in the United Arab Emirates. The 2017 FIFA U-17 World Cup also recorded the highest goal average of 3.40 per match since the tournament format was expanded from 16 teams to 24 teams in 2007.

In September 2017, India submitted a bid to host the 2019 FIFA U-20 World Cup, but lost to Poland. India was selected to host the 2020 FIFA U-17 Women's World Cup by the FIFA Council on 15 March 2019.

Notes

References

External links

FIFA U-17 World Cup India 2017 at FIFA.com (archived)
FIFA Technical Report

 
2017 in youth association football
2017–18 in Indian football
2017
2017
October 2017 sports events in Asia